Bib Stillwell (born Bermar Sellars Stillwell; 31 July 1927 – 12 June 1999) was a racing driver who was active in Australian motor racing from 1947 to 1965. He won the Australian Drivers' Championship in each of the four years from 1962 to 1965.

Racing career
Stillwell competed in his first race in 1947 at the Ballarat Airstrip circuit, driving an MG TC. He won the Victorian Trials Championship with the MG in the following year and competed in his first Australian Grand Prix in 1953 at the wheel of an Austin-Healey 100. Stillwell imported a new Jaguar D-Type for 1956 and won the Argus Cup, the SA Trophy and the News South Wales Sports Car Championship in that year. He also placed fifth in the 1956 Australian Tourist Trophy against international opposition. He subsequently raced Maserati, Aston Martin, Cooper and Repco Brabham cars. Stillwell drove an Aston Martin DB4 GT Zagato in the 1961 Le Mans 24 Hour Race with fellow Australian Lex Davison but the car did not finish.

Stillwell won the 1962 Australian Drivers' Championship with a Cooper and the 1963, 1964 and 1965 Australian Drivers' Championships driving Repco Brabhams. He was also victorious in the Australian Tourist Trophy in 1961 and 1962 in a Cooper Monaco and the 1965 Australian One and a Half Litre Championship with a Repco Brabham.

Although he never won an Australian Grand Prix, he placed second in 1961 and 1964 driving a Cooper and a Repco-Brabham respectively, and third in 1960 and 1962 in Coopers.

Stillwell retired from motor racing at the end of the 1965 season. He later participated in historic races in Australia and the United States.

Results

Complete Tasman Series results

Business and private life
Stillwell opened an automotive dealership selling MGs in 1949 and subsequently obtained a Jaguar franchise. A Holden dealership followed, and was to become one of the largest in the Australia. A switch from Holden to Ford in 1966 was followed by the establishment of Stillwell Aviation in 1967 with distribution rights for Beechcraft and later Learjet aircraft. Stillwell moved to the United States in 1979 to take on the role of vice-president of the Gates Learjet Corporation and went on to become president of the company. He later established luxury car dealerships including a BMW franchise and a Jaguar franchise at Doncaster.

Stillwell was married with five children. His son Michael followed Bib into motorsport, becoming a class front runner in the Australian Touring Car Championship in the 1970s.

Stillwell was awarded an Order of Australia Medal posthumously, in January 2001. The award was bestowed for services to the motor industry, to the aviation industry, to motor sport and to the community.

References

Businesspeople from Melbourne
1927 births
1999 deaths
Tasman Series drivers
Racing drivers from Melbourne